Taoyang is a town and the county seat of Lintao County, Dingxi, Gansu, China. It is located centrally in Lintao at a junction of major roads.

The town relies mainly on agriculture, supported by favourable irrigation supply from the Tao River. It is also a tourist destination, owing to historic sites and temples. The Gansu Majiayao Painted Pottery Culture Museum is located in Taoyang.

Taoyang governs 30 villages and 12 residential communities.

References 

Township-level divisions of Gansu
Lintao County